Theatre of Sheep was an American new wave band from Portland, Oregon, formed in 1982. They were popular locally but never made the jump to a wider audience.

History
Theatre of Sheep formed in 1980 with a line-up of Rozz Rezabek (formerly of Negative Trend), Jimi Haskett (guitar), Brian Wassman (drums), John (Clifford) Goins (bass) and Lesli Arbuthnot (keyboards). Bassist Jim Wallace then replaced Goins. Their 1983 cassette-only release, A Cathartic Aquacade, was produced and engineered by Greg Sage, leader of Portland punk band the Wipers.

Theatre of Sheep's debut 12" extended play, A Quiet Crusade, was released on their own Sheepish label in 1983, followed by a cassette-only collection, Theatre of Sheep's Greatest Hits.

The band broke up in 1984.

Other projects
Rezabek later released several solo recordings, including the 1999 album Lover Legend Liar, and appeared in the 1998 documentary film Kurt & Courtney.

Legacy and reunions
Theatre of Sheep were documented with the 2006 compilation album Old Flames.

The band reunited for Portland shows at Slabtown in 2007. and the closing of Satyricon in 2010.

Members
Rozz Rezabek – vocals (1980-1984, 2007, 2010)
Jimi Haskett – guitar (1980-1984, 2007, 2010)
Brian Wassman – drums (1980-1984)
Lesli Arbuthnot – keyboards (1980-1984, 2007, 2010)
John (Clifford) Goins – bass (1980)
Jim Wallace – bass/keyboards (1983, 2007, 2010)
Mark Sten – bass 
Rob Ohearn – keyboards 
Kevin Jarvis – drums

Discography

EPs
A Cathartic Aquacade cassette (1983, self-released)
A Quiet Crusade 12" (1983, Sheepish)

Compilation albums
Theatre of Sheep's Greatest Hits cassette (1984, Sheepish)
Old Flames (2007, self-released)

References

External links
 Official Myspace page

Musical groups from Portland, Oregon
1980 establishments in Oregon
1984 disestablishments in Oregon
Musical groups established in 1980
Musical groups disestablished in 1984